Délphine Maréchal (born 21 September 1972) is a French former synchronized swimmer who competed in the 1996 Summer Olympics.

References

1972 births
Living people
French synchronized swimmers
Olympic synchronized swimmers of France
Synchronized swimmers at the 1996 Summer Olympics